Eric Jurgensen Flores (born April 9, 1963 in La Paz, Bolivia)  was the CEO, general manager and programming director of América Televisión Channel 4 in Peru.

He got a bachelor's degree in business administration specializing in marketing and 
finance from the University of Arizona. However, he has been working in the television industry for over 32 years. He speaks fluently Spanish, English and German.

America TV 
A Bolivian/American executive, with a degree in business administration with a specialization in marketing and finance in the U.S. Fluent in English, Spanish and German languages.

Highly skilled in successfully directing and re-launching TV channels and optimizing small budgets while using creativity to achieve positive results in the categories of positioning, billing and audience share.

Highly capable and creative in terms of strategic development of production and programming especially in relation to negotiations and sales.

From 2003 to 2018, Jurgensen acted as the chief executive officer and chief content officer of América TV in Peru.

When taking over the channel in 2003, it had a negative equity of over 80 million dollars and a liability of over 100 million dollars. And, in just seven and a half years, from 2003 to 2011, América TV managed to pay all its debts and now has a net worth of over 400 million dollars.

América TV has become the absolute leader of the Peruvian television market, with an audience share ranging between 34% and 39%.

Jurgensen Media Group 

A company formed by Jurgensen to give advice and services to any TV Station in all different areas, especially in strategic planning, programming strategies, content production and digital areas. Jurgensen  with more than 32 years of experience managing different TV stations in various countries, now is ready to offer this type of service.

Telefuturo 
Planned, organized, executed and managed the Commercial, Programming, Promotional, Production, Operations and Administrative Departments for Channel 4 in Paraguay.
During this time publicity sales increased by 55% and viewership share increased from 24% in July 1999 to 42% in December 2001. Currently, Channel 4 Telefuturo is the number-one television station in Paraguay.

Red Uno 

In addition, he was also responsible for the re-launching of Red Uno in La Paz, Bolivia. Between January and June 2002, Red Uno's viewership increased by 50% and sales by 65%. A thorough restructuring of the News Department regains respect and viewership for this segment.

References 

University of Arizona alumni
Living people
1963 births